Hege Jensen (born 12 April 1971) is a Norwegian politician for the Progress Party.

She served as a deputy representative to the Parliament of Norway from Hedmark during the term 2013–2017. In total she met during 129 days of parliamentary session. She hails from Stange.

References

1971 births
Living people
People from Stange
Deputy members of the Storting
Progress Party (Norway) politicians
Hedmark politicians
Women members of the Storting
21st-century Norwegian women politicians
21st-century Norwegian politicians